The 2008–09 season was the 62nd season in Rijeka's history. It was their 17th season in the Prva HNL and 34th successive top tier season.

Competitions

Prva HNL

Classification

Results summary

Results by round

Matches

Prva HNL

Source: HRnogomet.com

Croatian Cup

Source: HRnogomet.com

Squad statistics
Competitive matches only.  Appearances in brackets indicate numbers of times the player came on as a substitute.

See also
2007–08 Prva HNL
2007–08 Croatian Cup

References

External sources
 2007–08 Prva HNL at HRnogomet.com
 2007–08 Croatian Cup at HRnogomet.com 
 Prvenstvo 2007.-2008. at nk-rijeka.hr

HNK Rijeka seasons
Rijeka